Greely may refer to:

People

Surname
 Adolphus Greely (1844–1935), American polar explorer and United States Army officer 
Ann F. Jarvis Greely (1831-1914), American women's rights activist 
Aurora Greely (born 1905), American choreographer
 Hannah Greely (born 1979), American artist
 Penny Greely , American wheelchair curler and sitting volleyball player
 Rose Greely (1883–1969), an American landscape architect

Given name
 Greely S. Curtis (1830–1897), American Civil War officer

Places
 Greely, Ontario, Canada
 Fort Greely, U.S. Army missile launch site in Alaska
Fort Greely, Alaska, census-designated place surrounding Fort Greely

See also 
 Greeley (disambiguation)
Horace Greeley (disambiguation)